Ngapara is a locality in the north Otago region of New Zealand's South Island.  It is located in a rural setting 25 km inland from Oamaru.  The name of Ngapara is derived from the Māori word for the "tables" or plateaus of limestone in the area.

Economy 

Agriculture is the most important economic activity, with farming activity consisting primarily of sheep husbandry and growing cereal crops such as wheat.  A flour mill was established in the town in 1898.  Heavier industrial activity has also taken place around Ngapara, including mining for lignite coal and limestone.
In recent years due to the dairy boom happening around New Zealand, there has been an increase in the number of dairy farms in the surrounding area. This is aided by the installment of the Tokarahi Irrigation Scheme in 2006. This scheme has provided a much needed source of water to farmers of the area.

Railway 

From 1 April 1877 until 31 July 1959, Ngapara was the terminus of the Ngapara Branch, a branch line railway that left the Main South Line near Oamaru.  At its peak, Ngapara station had a small locomotive depot, complete with turntable.  Ngapara was one of the first towns on New Zealand's national rail network to lose its passenger service, with a bus substitute introduced in December 1926.  In the wake of this decision, the locomotive depot was closed in 1927 and trains operated from Oamaru rather than Ngapara, though the turntable remained inactive and was not removed until the last train, a work train that ran on 10 December 1959, months after the official closure.  Some remnants of the railway remain, including the station's platform and loading bank, and the station sign is now affixed to the exterior of the local rugby club's rooms.

School 

Ngapara Primary School was opened in 1877, for 5 to 13-year-old children. In latter years it had 23 students and one teacher. When the students reached high school age they were bused into Oamaru to one of its three high schools. In 1998 the school closed, and since then students have mostly attended the primary school in Weston, with some at Duntroon primary school.  Much of Ngapara Primary School's buildings and supplies were transferred for use in Weston.

Ngapara statistical area
Ngapara statistical area includes Georgetown and Tokarahi.

The statistical area had a population of 1,806 at the 2018 New Zealand census, an increase of 195 people (12.1%) since the 2013 census, and an increase of 270 people (17.6%) since the 2006 census. There were 681 households. There were 948 males and 855 females, giving a sex ratio of 1.11 males per female. The median age was 34.1 years (compared with 37.4 years nationally), with 429 people (23.8%) aged under 15 years, 342 (18.9%) aged 15 to 29, 882 (48.8%) aged 30 to 64, and 150 (8.3%) aged 65 or older.

Ethnicities were 83.1% European/Pākehā, 6.8% Māori, 0.3% Pacific peoples, 12.1% Asian, and 4.0% other ethnicities (totals add to more than 100% since people could identify with multiple ethnicities).

The proportion of people born overseas was 20.9%, compared with 27.1% nationally.

Although some people objected to giving their religion, 51.0% had no religion, 39.5% were Christian, 0.8% were Hindu, 0.2% were Buddhist and 2.0% had other religions.

Of those at least 15 years old, 246 (17.9%) people had a bachelor or higher degree, and 255 (18.5%) people had no formal qualifications. The median income was $37,600, compared with $31,800 nationally. 198 people (14.4%) earned over $70,000 compared to 17.2% nationally. The employment status of those at least 15 was that 834 (60.6%) people were employed full-time, 237 (17.2%) were part-time, and 15 (1.1%) were unemployed.

References

External links 
 Map and history of the Ngapara Branch railway

Waitaki District
Populated places in Otago